Crandall is an unincorporated community in Murray County, Georgia, United States. Crandall has a post office with ZIP code 30711.

References

Unincorporated communities in Murray County, Georgia
Unincorporated communities in Georgia (U.S. state)